Juno-class corvettes were a collective of two ships built during the 1860s in Southeast England. The ships were all made in two years apart from each other and were in service in the Royal Navy.

Characteristics and construction
They were designed to carry troops with the accommodation arranged with the soldiers on the lower deck, and the sailors on the upper deck. Thalia was the last ship to be built at Woolwich Royal Dockyard, laid down in 1866 and launched 14 July 1869 and completed for the Royal Navy in May 1870. It had a displacement of 2,240 tons, its crew numbered 200, top speed it achieved was 11.13 knots, and it was armed with two 7-inch MLR  and four 64-pounder cannons. It was later being rearmed with six  64-pounders. Juno  was built by Deptford Dockyard and laid down in 1866, launched on 28 November 1867 and completed in May 1868. It displacement was 2,083 tons, its crew 200, top speed it achieved was 10.53 knots. Armaments for the ship were usually two 7-inch MLR and four 64-pounder cannons, later being rearmed with eight 64-pounders.

Ships

Service history
The Surveyor to the Royal Navy during 1863 to 1870, Sir Edward Reid was the designer of these two wooden screw corvettes, HMS Juno and HMS Thalia. Both ships were completed by 1870 compliant to British demands at that time to match the French, American, and Russian small ships at that time. The ships were made alongside 35 others in the 1867-1868 programme written in the Parliamentary Debates. Both ships were included in the ¨op¨ in the 1878 official list. At that time Juno was in China and Thalia was in the Devonport Dockyard.  Although they were regarded as ¨Fighting Ships¨. They shared this classification with Iris, Mercury, and the torpedo boat . In 1882, Thalia was named for ¨Particular¨ which meant at that time she was probably going to be fitted to be a troopship. In 1886, Thalia was refitted to be a troopship and later in 1915 to be a depot ship. Juno was sold in 1887.

References

Corvette classes
Victorian-era corvettes of the United Kingdom